For chemical solutions, a Steric exclusion occurs when a solute molecule in water has a relatively larger hydrodynamic radius than water leading to a deficiency of the solute molecule in the vicinity of a second solute molecule (which must have some hydrophilic surfaces) of interest.

References

Solutions